Charles Corneille Juliette 'Carlo' Huyghé (11 March 1923  27 December 2016) was a Belgian national who worked at the cabinet of the independent Katangese Secretary of State of National Defense Joseph Yav. His role in the assassination of Congo's first Prime Minister Patrice Lumumba is still the subject of debate.

Early life and career 
Huyghé was the child of a Walloon father and a Flemish mother. From his father's side, During the Second World War, he was a volunteer at the Royal Air Force.

Career 
Huyghé moved to the Belgian Congo in 1945, where he worked for the Belgian colonial administration for almost twenty years. In March 1960, he was called to install a special unit for intervention at the European volunteers' corps. At the time of Katanga's declaration of independence by Moïse Tshombe in July 1960, Katangese Interior Minister Godefroid Munongo's Chef de cabinet Victor Tignée appointed Huyghé as his deputy Chef de cabinet. In October 1960, the Secretariats were created, which enlarged the government. Hugyhé became the deputy Chef de cabinet of Secretary of State of National Defense Joseph Yav, family member of Tshombe. He was involved in the procurement of weaponry for Katanga. According to a United Nations report in the wake of the arrests of thirty mercenaries apprehended in Kabalo on 7 April 1961, Huyghé led a recruitment office for mercenaries for Katanga in Johannesburg, South Africa, together with Roderick Russell Cargill. In August 1961, Huyghé received an expulsion order and left for Paris, but became Chef de cabinet of Yav, replacing colonel Grandjean, in November. He stayed in Katanga until the end of 1962.

Involvement in Lumumba's murder 
According to the United Nations Commission of Investigation into the deaths of Patrice Lumumba, Maurice Mpolo, and Joseph Okito, a "great deal of suspicion is cast" on Huyghé, "as being the actual perpetrator of Mr. Lumumba's murder", with Captain Julien Gat accessory to the crime.

Later life 
Huyghé moved to South Africa after the end of the Katangese secession in 1963. He lived in Craighall on the outskirts of Johannesburg. He played an important role in the Western community in the country, occupying several positions in the social life of Johannesburg, such as President of the Union of Francophone Belgians Abroad and President of the Belgian Business Association.

Honours 
:  Knight of the Order of Leopold (2002)
:  Officer of the Order of Leopold (2009)

References 

1923 births
2016 deaths
Belgian Congo officials
People of the Congo Crisis